Blind Date with Violence is the debut album by thrash metal band The Scourger. It was released on January 4, 2006 and later re-released as an international version with bonus tracks on October 6, 2006 via Cyclone Records. Two of the album's singles landed on the national Finnish charts: "Hatehead" at #1 in July 2005, and "Maximum Intensity" at #3 the following year, climbing to #2 one week later.

Track listing
"Decline of Conformity / Grading: Deranged" – 5:52
"Hatehead" – 3:32
"Maximum Intensity" - 3:43
"Enslaved to Faith" – 3:16
"The Oath & the Lie" – 3:18
"Chapter Thirteen" – 4:58
"Pain Zone" - 4:53
"Exodus Day" – 4:30
"Feast of the Carnivore" – 4:48
"Ghosts of War" (Slayer cover) – 3:48
"Over the Wall" (Testament cover) – 4:14
"The Greediness" – 5:28
"Black Worms" – 6:05
"Grading: Deranged [Live]" – 5:04
"Maximum Intensity [Live]" – 3:41
"The Oath & the Lie [Live]" – 3:32

Tracks 10–16 are bonus tracks from the international version.

Credits
Jari Hurskainen – vocals
Seppo Tarvainen – drums
Jani Luttinen – guitars
Timo Nyberg – guitars
Kimmo Kammonen – bass
Aaro Seppovaara – producing, engineering, mixing
Petri Majuri – mastering

References

2006 albums
The Scourger albums